Lara Ricote is a Mexican American comedian.

Early life
Ricote is the daughter of Mexican actress Gabriela Rivero and photographer Luis Francisco Ricote. She grew up in Miami before moving to the Netherlands to study politics at the University of Amsterdam.

Career
Ricote began performing improv and stand-up comedy while living in Amsterdam. She has performed in both English and Spanish.

In 2021, Ricote won the Funny Women Stage Award. At the 2022 Edinburgh Festival Fringe, she performed her debut solo show GRL/LATNX/DEF and won the Edinburgh Comedy Award for Best Newcomer.

In May 2022, Ricote featured in Rosie Jones's Disability Comedy Extravaganza, a comedy special released on UKTV Play. In October of the same year, she appeared on the panel shows Mel Giedroyc: Unforgivable and Question Team, both broadcast on Dave.

Personal life
Ricote is hard of hearing and lives in the Netherlands.

See also
 List of Edinburgh Comedy Award winners

References

University of Amsterdam alumni
People from Miami

Year of birth missing (living people)
Living people
Comedians from Florida
American people of Mexican descent
21st-century American comedians
American women comedians